Lokmanya Tilak Terminus - Tatanagar Antyodaya Express is a superfast express train of the Indian Railways connecting Lokmanya Tilak Terminus in Maharashtra and  Tatanagar Junction in Jharkhand. It is currently being operated with 22885/22886 train numbers on a weekly basis.

Coach composition 

The trains is completely general coaches trains designed by Indian Railways with features of LED screen display to show information about stations, train speed etc. Vending machines for tea, coffee and milk, Bio toilets in compartments as well as CCTV cameras as well as facility for potable drinking water and mobile charging points and toilet occupancy indicators.

Service

It averages 68 km/hr as 22885 Antyodaya Express starts on Tuesday and Saturday and covering 2285 km in 25 hrs 1697 km/hr as 22878 Antyodaya Express starts on Sunday and Thursday covering 1711 km in 25 hrs 50 mins.

Route & Halts

Locomotive

Both trains are hauled by a Tatanagar based WAP 7 electric locomotives on its entire journey.

See also 

 Antyodaya Express
 Lokmanya Tilak Terminus railway station
 Tatanagar Junction railway station
 Howrah - Ernakulam Antyodaya Express

Notes

References

External links
22885/Lokmanya Tilak Terminus - Tatanagar Antyodaya Express
22886/Tatanagar - Lokmanya Tilak TerminusT Antyodaya Express

Antyodaya Express trains
Rail transport in Jharkhand
Rail transport in Maharashtra
Rail transport in Odisha
Rail transport in Chhattisgarh
2017 establishments in India
Transport in Mumbai
Transport in Jamshedpur
Railway services introduced in 2017